Dawson County is the name of several counties in the United States:

 Dawson County, Georgia
 Dawson County, Montana 
 Dawson County, Nebraska 
 Dawson County, Texas